Marinko Kekezović (born 20 August 1985) is a Serbian-Hungarian handball player for Hungarian club Dabas.

Career
After playing for five years with Sintelon (later known as Tarkett), Kekezović moved to Hungary and joined Kecskemét in 2008. He also played for fellow Hungarian teams Tatabánya, Pécs, Orosházi FKSE and Pick Szeged, before moving to Romanian club Pandurii Târgu Jiu in 2014.

In August 2005, Kekezović represented Serbia and Montenegro at the World Under-21 Championship, as the team finished as runners-up.

Honours
Pick Szeged
 EHF Cup: 2013–14

References

External links
 EHF record
 MKSZ record

1985 births
Living people
Sportspeople from Novi Sad
Naturalized citizens of Hungary
Serbian male handball players
Hungarian male handball players
RK Sintelon players
SC Pick Szeged players
Expatriate handball players
Serbian expatriate sportspeople in Hungary
Serbian expatriate sportspeople in Romania